McConnell Cup is a team event for women held every four years as part of the World Bridge Series Championships. The event was inaugurated in 1994 and is named in honor of Ruth McConnell, former treasurer for the World Bridge Federation (WBF) and former president of the American Contract Bridge League (ACBL). McConnell was also instrumental in inaugurating the Venice Cup women's team championship in 1974.

The full name of this championship is World Women Knockout Teams. The knockout format pertains only to the late stages, however, evidently a four-round knockout with 16 teams except for a five-round 32-team KO in 1998. It appears that the field has been divided into two groups or four groups for round-robin play, with the top eight or top four advancing from each group to the knockout stage. 

The next rendition will be at the "World Bridge Series Championships" meet in 2014. The Chinese Contract Bridge Association will host in Sanya, Hainan, from 10 to 25 October. The series name for the meet is new but WBF calls this the 14th World Bridge Series, or 14th Red Bull World Bridge Series. It will be the 6th competition for the McConnell Cup, and the 6th world championship for women teams in the series.

Results

References

External links

 Women program top page at the World Bridge Federation
 World Women KO Teams Championship 1994–present (table) at the World Bridge Federation 

Contract bridge world competitions